Schinkel is a surname. Notable people with the surname include:

 Karl Friedrich Schinkel (1781–1841), early 19th-century German architect
 Ken Schinkel (1932–2020), Canadian ice hockey player and coach

See also
 Frank Schinkels (born 1963), Dutch footballer

German-language surnames